The year 2019 is the 10th year in the history of the Road Fighting Championship, a mma promotion based in South Korea. 2019 starts with Road FC 052.

Road FC $1 Million Dollar Lightweight Tournament 'Road To A-Sol' Bracket

List of events

Title fights

Road FC 057 XX 

Goobne mall Road FC 057 XX  is a mixed martial arts event scheduled to be held by Road FC on December 14, 2019, at the Convention Centre, Grand Hilton Seoul in Seoul, South Korea.

Background

Fight card

Road FC 056

Goobne mall Road FC 056 was a mixed martial arts event held by Road Fighting Championship on November 9, 2019 at the Jinnam Gymnasium in Yeosu, South Jeolla Province, South Korea.

Background

Fight card

Road FC 055

Goobne mall Road FC 056 was a mixed martial arts event held by Road Fighting Championship on September 8, 2019 at the Daegu Gymnasium in Daegu, South Korea.

Background
The event featured the first title defense for Road FC Featherweight Champion Jeong-Yeong Lee against fellow countryman Hae-Jin Park as the Road FC 55 headliner.

Results

Road FC 054 

Goobne mall Road FC 054 was a mixed martial arts event scheduled to be held by Road FC on June 15, 2019, at the Wonju Gymnasium in Wonju, Gangwon-do, South Korea.

Fight card

Road FC 053 

Goobne mall Road FC 053 was a mixed martial arts event scheduled to be held by Road FC on May 18, 2019, at the Halla Gymnasium in Jeju, South Korea.

Fight card

Road FC 052 

Goobne mall Road FC 052 was a mixed martial arts MMA event held by Road FC on February 23, 2019, at the Jangchung Gymnasium in Seoul, South Korea.

Background
The event featured the ROAD FC  $1 Million Lightweight Tournament finals between Shamil Zavurov and Mansour Barnaoui to earn a shot at reigning lightweight champion A-Sol Kwon and the US$1 million prize.

Fight card

See also
 List of Road FC events
 List of Road FC champions
 List of current Road FC fighters
 List of current mixed martial arts champions

References 

Road Fighting Championship events
Road FC
Road FC
Road FC